Australian children's musical group Hi-5 released fifteen studio albums, three compilation albums, two reissues, and three singles. Five of the group's albums were certified by the Australian Recording Industry Association (ARIA) as gold, platinum and double platinum. Four of their albums reached the top 10 on the ARIA Albums Chart.

The original line-up's debut studio album, Jump and Jive with Hi-5 (1999), charted at number 33 in Australia in December 1999, and was accredited as platinum in 2000. The quintet's first single, "Santa Claus is Coming" (1999), reached number 52 on the singles chart when it was re-released in 2000. Their second studio album, It's a Party (2000) was the first release to reach the top ten, charting at number four in July 2000. It was certified double platinum in 2001 and was their only release to do so. Boom Boom Beat (2001), Hi-5's third studio album, peaked at number three in August 2001 and was certified as platinum.

It's a Hi-5 Christmas (2001) reached number four on the ARIA albums chart in December 2001 and was accredited as platinum. Hi-5 received a gold certification for their fifth studio album, Celebrate (2002). The group's first greatest hits compilation, Hi-5 Hits (2003), reached number ten in July 2003. By 2004, the group had received five consecutive ARIA Music Awards in the same category, Best Children's Album, which was a record at the time. It's a Hi-5 Christmas and Jingle Jangle Jingle with Hi-5 (2004) returned to the charts in 2009, debuting on the ARIA Catalogue Albums Chart in November and December respectively. The former peaked at number three in December 2012 and the latter reached number five in the same month.

Albums

Studio albums

Compilation albums

Reissues

Singles

Notes

References

External links
 

Hi-5
Pop music group discographies